Adam Hrdina (born 12 February 2004) is a Slovak footballer who plays for Slovan Bratislava as a goalkeeper.

Club career

Slovan Bratislava
Hrdina made his Fortuna Liga debut for Slovan Bratislava against Orion Tip Sereď on 14 May 2022. He kept a clean sheet in the match.

Honours
Slovan Bratislava
Fortuna Liga: 2021–22

References

External links
 ŠK Slovan Bratislava official club profile 
 
 Fortuna Liga profile
 Futbalnet profile 

2004 births
Living people
People from Nová Baňa
Sportspeople from the Banská Bystrica Region
Slovak footballers
Slovakia youth international footballers
Association football goalkeepers
ŠK Slovan Bratislava players
2. Liga (Slovakia) players
Slovak Super Liga players